Dolly Dawn (born Theresa Maria Stabile; February 3, 1916 – December 11, 2002) was an American big band singer. She was vocalist with George Hall's Hotel Taft Orchestra in the 1930s, and later had a solo career.

Life
She was born in Newark, New Jersey in 1916, and grew up in Montclair, New Jersey. Her parents were Italian immigrants; the jazz saxophonist Dick Stabile was a cousin.

As Billie Starr, she appeared weekly on a local radio show. In 1935 she replaced Loretta Lee as vocalist with George Hall's orchestra; she was given the name Dolly Dawn by Harriet Mencken, a writer for the New York Journal-American. She and the band broadcast six days a week from the Grill Room of the Taft Hotel in New York via CBS Radio, and became very popular. Her most successful song with the band was "You're a Sweetheart", released in 1938.

On July 4, 1941, at the Roseland Ballroom in New York, George Hall officially turned the band over to her, and became her manager; the band was renamed "Dolly Dawn and Her Dawn Patrol". 
From 1942 she continued without the band, whose members were drafted during the Second World War. She appeared in clubs and dance halls and in other engagements throughout the US, and continued to record into the 1950s.

A two LP compilation of Dolly Dawn's recordings with George Hall was issued by RCA Records in 1976, which led to appearances at jazz clubs and cabarets in New York. She recorded two new albums: Smooth as Silk, and in 1981 Memories of You.

Ella Fitzgerald said that Dawn was an influence on her own singing. On February 4, 1998, Dolly Dawn was inducted into the Big Band Hall of Fame in West Palm Beach, Florida. She did not marry; she said her music was her husband and children. She died in 2002 aged 86, at the Lillian Booth Actors Home in Englewood, New Jersey.

References

External links
 
 Dolly Dawn (vocalist) at Discography of American Historical Recordings
 Dolly Dawn "The Champagne of Big Band Singers" 1916–2002 Peter Sando

1916 births
2002 deaths
American people of Italian descent
Musicians from Newark, New Jersey
Big band singers
20th-century American singers
20th-century American women singers